Cereal Productions is a Pakistani television and film production company which has produced several television series since 2016. It is founded by Adnan Siddiqui and Akhtar Hasnain. The production house will release its first feature film, Dum Mastam in May 2022.

Former Productions

Film
 Dum Mastam

Television

Accolades 

 Lux Style Awards - Best Original Soundtrack - Ghughi by Beena Khan and Naveed Nashad - Nominated

References 

Pakistani companies established in 2016
Pakistani film studios